Alexandros Papafingos (born 1901, date of death unknown) was a Greek sprinter. He competed in three events at the 1924 Summer Olympics.

References

External links
 

1901 births
Year of death missing
Greek male sprinters
Olympic athletes of Greece
Athletes (track and field) at the 1924 Summer Olympics
Sportspeople from Alexandria
Egyptian people of Greek descent
20th-century Greek people